Kevin James Pedrotti (5 April 1948 – 11 April 2011) was an Australian rules footballer who played with South Melbourne in the Victorian Football League (VFL).

Notes

External links 

1948 births
2011 deaths
Australian rules footballers from Victoria (Australia)
Sydney Swans players